Beutenaken is a hamlet in the southeastern Netherlands. It is part of the village of Slenaken in the municipality of Gulpen-Wittem, Limburg, about 20 km east of Maastricht. Older names for the village are Bottinachs, Butenacho and Butenachen.

The village is built as a linear settlement in the valley of the Gulp river, on a road connecting Waterop with Slenaken. The village has a chapel dedicated to Maria dating from 1880 and a chapel dedicated to the Sacred heart dating from 1929. Also it has several timber framing  buildings, including a farm located at Beutenaken 38, which dates from the 18th century and has been designated a national monument.

Gallery

References

External links 
 Beutenaken on Plaats.nl
 

Populated places in Limburg (Netherlands)
Gulpen-Wittem